Roger Allen Repoz (born August 3, 1940) is an American former professional baseball outfielder, who played for nine seasons in Major League Baseball (MLB) for the New York Yankees, Kansas City Athletics and California Angels. He also played five seasons in Japan’s Nippon Professional Baseball (NPB), for the Taiheiyo Club Lions and Yakult Swallows.

Repoz was born in Bellingham, Washington. After graduating from Bellingham High School and Western Washington University, he was signed as an amateur free agent by the Yankees prior to the 1960 season.

In 1971, Repoz became the first player in MLB history to compile an OPS of greater than .700 while putting up a batting average of under .200 and playing in a minimum of 100 games.

Strong defensively, Repoz posted a career .991 fielding percentage playing at all three outfield positions and first base.

References

External links

Roger Repoz at SABR (Baseball BioProject)

1940 births
Living people
American expatriate baseball players in Japan
Augusta Yankees players
Baseball players from Washington (state)
California Angels players
Columbus Confederate Yankees players
Kansas City Athletics players
Major League Baseball outfielders
Modesto Reds players
New York Yankees players
Rochester Red Wings players
St. Petersburg Saints players
Salt Lake City Angels players
Sportspeople from Bellingham, Washington
Taiheiyo Club Lions players
Toledo Mud Hens players
Western Washington Vikings baseball players
Yakult Swallows players